The Defamation Act 1996 (c 31) is an Act of the Parliament of the United Kingdom.

Section 4 - Limitation of actions: England and Wales
This section substitutes sections 4A, 28(4A), 32A and 36(1)(aa) of the Limitation Act 1980.

Section 5 - Limitation of actions: Northern Ireland
This section substitutes articles 6(2), 48(7) and 51 of the Limitation (Northern Ireland) Order 1989 (SI 1989/1339) (NI 11).

Section 9 - Meaning of summary relief
Sections 9(2A) to (2D) were inserted by paragraph 255 of Schedule 4 to the Constitutional Reform Act 2005. Section 9(4) was inserted by paragraph 52(b) of Schedule 18 to the Northern Ireland Act 1998 (Devolution of Policing and Justice Functions) Order 2010 (SI 2010/976).

Section 12 - Evidence of convictions
This section inserts section 13(2A) of the Civil Evidence Act 1968, section 12(2A) of the Law Reform (Miscellaneous Provisions) (Scotland) Act 1968 and section 9(2A) of the Civil Evidence Act (Northern Ireland) 1971.

Section 13 - Evidence concerning proceedings in Parliament
This section was repealed by paragraph 44 of Schedule 23 to the Deregulation Act 2015.

Section 14 - Reports of court proceedings absolutely privileged
See Absolute privilege in English law

Section 14(3) was substituted by section 7(1) of the Defamation Act 2013.

Section 17 - Interpretation
Section 17(aa) was inserted by paragraph 33(2) of Schedule 8 to the Scotland Act 1998.

Section 19 - Commencement
The following orders have been made under this section:
The Defamation Act 1996 (Commencement No. 1) Order 1999 (S.I. 1999/817 (C. 26))
The Defamation Act 1996 (Commencement No. 2) Order 2000 (S.I. 2000/222 (C. 7))
The Defamation Act 1996 (Commencement No. 3 and Transitional Provision) (Scotland) Order 2001 (S.S.I. 2001/98 (C. 3)
The Defamation Act 1996 (Commencement No. 4) Order 2009 (S.I. 2009/2858 (C. 125))

Section 20 - Short title and saving
Section 20(2) was repealed as to England and Wales by section 178 of, and Part 2 of Schedule 23 to, the Coroners and Justice Act 2009. Section 20(2) was repealed as to Scotland by paragraph 64 of Schedule 7 to the Criminal Justice and Licensing (Scotland) Act 2010. These repeals were consequential to the abolition of criminal libel.

Schedule 1
Paragraphs 9 and 10 were substituted by section 7(4) of the Defamation Act 2013.

Paragraph 11(1)(aa) was inserted by article 12(b) of the Local Authorities (Executive Arrangements) (Modification of Enactments) (England) Order 2002 (SI 2002/1057). Paragraph 11(1A) was inserted by article 31(b) of the Local Authorities (Executive and Alternative Arrangements) (Modification of Enactments and Other Provisions) (England) Order 2001 (SI 2001/2237) and article 30(b) of the Local Authorities (Executive and Alternative Arrangements) (Modification of Enactments and Other Provisions) (Wales) Order 2002 (SI 2002/808) (W 89). The definitions of "executive" and "executive arrangements" in paragraph 11(2) were repealed by article 12(c)(ii) of the Local Authorities (Executive Arrangements) (Modification of Enactments) (England) Order 2002. Paragraph 11(2A) was inserted by article 12(d) of the Local Authorities (Executive Arrangements) (Modification of Enactments) (England) Order 2002.

Paragraph 11A was inserted by section 7(5) of the Defamation Act 2013.

New paragraphs 13(2) to (4) were substituted for paragraphs 13(2) to (5) by section 7(7)(b) of the Defamation Act 2013.

Paragraph 14A was inserted by section 7(9) of the Defamation Act 2013.

Paragraph 15 was substituted by section 7(10) of the Defamation Act 2013. Paragraph 15(1)(a) was substituted by paragraph 53(a)(i) of the Northern Ireland Act 1998 (Devolution of Policing and Justice Functions) Order 2010 (SI 2010/976). Paragraph 15(1)(c) was inserted by paragraph 53(a)(ii) of the Northern Ireland Act 1998 (Devolution of Policing and Justice Functions) Order 2010. Paragraph 15(3) was inserted by paragraph 53(a)(iv) of the Northern Ireland Act 1998 (Devolution of Policing and Justice Functions) Order 2010.

A new paragraph 16 was substituted for paragraphs 16 and 17 by section 7(11) of the Defamation Act 2013.

Paragraph 17(2)(a) was substituted by paragraph 53(b)(i) of the Northern Ireland Act 1998 (Devolution of Policing and Justice Functions) Order 2010. Paragraph 17(2)(c) was inserted by paragraph 53(b)(ii) of the Northern Ireland Act 1998 (Devolution of Policing and Justice Functions) Order 2010. Paragraph 17(4) was inserted by paragraph 53(a)(iv) of the Northern Ireland Act 1998 (Devolution of Policing and Justice Functions) Order 2010.

See also
Defamation Act
English defamation law

References
Claire Sandford and Fiona Boyle. The Defamation Act 1996: The New Law. (Impact Series). Northumbria Law Press. Newcastle. 1997.
"Defamation Act 1996". Halsbury's Statutes of England and Wales. Fourth Edition. 2009 Reissue. LexisNexis. Volume 19(3). Page 398. See also Preliminary Note at page 352.
Brian Hepworth. "Defamation Act 1996". Current Law Statutes 1996. Sweet & Maxwell. London. W Green. Edinburgh. 1997. Volume 2:  . Chapter 31.
"Defamation Act 1996" (1997) 15 International Media Law 6 WorldCat
Bayfield, "Defamation Act 1996" (1996) 140 Solicitors Journal 866 (13 September 1996)
Braithwaite, "The United Kingdom Defamation Act 1996" (1997) 15 Communications Lawyer 12 HeinOnline Google Books
Williams, "Only Flattery Is Safe: Political Speech and the Defamation Act 1996" (1997) 60 Modern Law Review 388 JSTOR
Sharland and Loveland, "The Defamation Act 1996 and Political Libels" [1997] Public Law 113

External links
The Defamation Act 1996, as amended from the National Archives.
The Defamation Act 1996, as originally enacted from the National Archives.

United Kingdom Acts of Parliament 1996
United Kingdom defamation law
English defamation law